Barbara Miller (born 1958 or 1959) is a Canadian politician who was elected in the 2015 Alberta general election to the Legislative Assembly of Alberta representing the electoral district of Red Deer-South. She was the president of the Red Deer and District Labour Council and a cashier for Safeway Canada.

Electoral history

2019 general election

2015 general election

References

1950s births
Alberta New Democratic Party MLAs
Alberta Party politicians
Canadian trade unionists
Living people
People from Red Deer, Alberta
Politicians from Edmonton
Women MLAs in Alberta
21st-century Canadian politicians
21st-century Canadian women politicians